The 1968–69 season was the 67th season in which Dundee competed at a Scottish national level, playing in Division One, where the club would finish in 9th place for the 2nd consecutive season. Domestically, Dundee would also compete in both the Scottish League Cup and the Scottish Cup, where they would reach the League Cup semi-finals before being defeated by Hibernian, and by Heart of Midlothian in the 1st round of the Scottish Cup.

Dundee would change their shirt style for the first time in over a decade, replacing their iconic v-neck shirt with a newer jersey.

Scottish Division One 

Statistics provided by Dee Archive.

League table

Scottish League Cup 

Statistics provided by Dee Archive.

Group 2

Group 2 table

Knockout stage

Scottish Cup 

Statistics provided by Dee Archive.

Player statistics 
Statistics provided by Dee Archive

|}

See also 

 List of Dundee F.C. seasons

References

External links 

 1968-69 Dundee season on Fitbastats

Dundee F.C. seasons
Dundee